Tulare Hill is a prominent hill in the Santa Teresa Hills of western Santa Clara County, California.  It lies along the southernmost edge of San Jose, California, adjacent to the Metcalf Energy Center.  The hill and surrounding  of serpentine grasslands are home to the endangered Bay checkerspot butterfly and Dudleya setchellii wildflower. A portion of the hill makes up the Tulare Hill Ecological Preserve.

Geography 

The hill sits atop the narrowest gap between the  Santa Cruz and  Diablo mountain ranges, and overlooks the  Laguna Seca wetlands in northern  Coyote Valley.

History 
Spanish padre Francisco Palóu passed over Tulare Hill during a 1774 expedition.

The hill was once part of the historic Rancho Santa Teresa and  Rancho Laguna Seca lands granted in the early 1800s.

Wildfires 

In August 2019, a brush fire consumed approximately 60 acres along the southwestern part of the hill, as well as a small area on the eastern side of nearby Santa Teresa County Park.

See also 
 List of summits of the San Francisco Bay Area

References 

Hills of California
Landforms of Santa Clara County, California
Geography of San Jose, California
Landforms of the San Francisco Bay Area